Annie Markart (sometimes credited as Anni Markart; 5 August 1907 – 23 January 1991) was a German film actress, singer and dancer. She appeared in twenty four films during her career, mostly during the Weimar and Nazi eras.

Selected filmography
 The Deed of Andreas Harmer (1930)
 Inquest (1931)
 Bobby Gets Going (1931)
 The Unknown Guest (1931)
 The Unfaithful Eckehart (1931)
 His Majesty's Adjutant (1932)
 Overnight Sensation (1932)
 Girls of Today (1933)
 The World Without a Mask (1934)
 The Flower Girl from the Grand Hotel (1934)
 The Champion of Pontresina (1934) 
 An Ideal Husband (1935)
 Knockout (1935)
 Every Day Isn't Sunday (1935)
 The White Horse Inn (1935)
 Three Wonderful Days (1939)
 Gold in New Frisco (1939)

References

External links

1907 births
1991 deaths
German film actresses
20th-century German actresses
Actors from Frankfurt